This list of fossil arthropods described in 2018 is a list of new taxa of trilobites, fossil insects, crustaceans, arachnids, and other fossil arthropods of every kind that were described during the year 2018, as well as other significant discoveries, and events related to arthropod paleontology that are scheduled to occur in the year 2018.

General research
 A study on extant arthropods (mainly insects and spiders) living around the resinous tree Hymenaea verrucosa in the lowland coastal forest of Madagascar and trapped by the resin produced by this tree species, and on their implications for inferring whether amber records the true past biodiversity of the entire forest, is published by Solórzano Kraemer et al. (2018).
 A study on the early evolution of stem and crown-arthropods as indicated by Ediacaran and Cambrian body and trace fossils is published by Daley et al. (2018).
 A study on the evolution of ecdysozoan vision, focusing on the evolution of arthropod multi-opsin vision, as indicated by molecular data and data from fossil record, is published by Fleming  et al. (2018).
 Grimaldi et al. (2018) report biological inclusions (fungi, plants, arachnids and insects) in amber from the Paleogene Chickaloon Formation of Alaska, representing the northernmost deposit of fossiliferous amber from the Cenozoic.
 A mantis lacewing larva found in association with two spiders, attached to one of the anterior walking legs of one of the spiders, is described from the Cretaceous amber from Myanmar by Haug, Müller & Haug (2018), who interpret this finding as evidence of palaeo-parasitism.

Arachnids

Research
 Review of arachnids known from the Bitterfeld amber (Germany) and a study on their implications for inferring the age of this deposit is published by Dunlop et al. (2018).
 The first fossil representative of the parasitic mite family Pterygosomatidae, assigned to the genus Pimeliaphilus and similar in morphology to the extant species parasitic on cockroaches, is described from the Cretaceous (Albian) Archingeay amber (France) by Sidorchuk & Khaustov (2018).
 Fossil mite "Sejus" bdelloides, originally interpret as a member of Mesostigmata, is reinterpreted as a member of Prostigmata referrable to the group Anystina by Dunlop, Walter & Kontschán (2018).
 A study on the body size of fossil mites is published by Sidorchuk (2018).
 A hard tick wrapped in spider silk is described from the Cretaceous Myanmar amber by Dunlop et al. (2018).
 A male specimen of a tick belonging to the genus Ornithodoros and the subgenus (Alectorobius) is described from the Dominican amber by Estrada-Peña & de la Fuente (2018), who also provide illustrated interpretations intended to support the validity of the identity of the fossils reported by de la Fuente (2003).
 A pseudoscorpion attached to barbules of a contour feather, possibly documenting a phoretic association between pseudoscorpions and Mesozoic birds, is described from the Cretaceous amber from Myanmar by Xing, McKellar & Gao (2018).
 A study on the phylogenetic history of spiders, based on molecular data and re-examination of the global fossil record, as well as on the ancestral predatory strategies among different groups of spiders and some of the possible drivers of spider diversification during the Early Cretaceous greenhouse, is published by Shao & Li (2018).
 A study on the burrows produced by wolf spiders belonging to the genus Pavocosa, aiming to identify ichnological signatures which may facilitate identification of wolf spider burrows in the fossil record, is published by Mendoza Belmontes, Melchor & Piacentini (2018).
 Fossil crevice weaver Misionella didicostae from Dominican amber is transferred to the genus Antilloides by Magalhaes (2018).
 Evidence of a fossilized cobweb, and a possible case of predation of a theridiid spider on a dolichopodid fly, are reported from the Mexican amber by García-Villafuerte (2018).

New taxa

Crustaceans

Research
 Redescription of the Ordovician malacostracan Wuningia multisegmenlata is published by Lin (2018).
 A member of the erymid genus Enoploclytia is described from the Oxfordian deposits of Cricquebœuf (Normandy, France) by Devillez, Charbonnier & Pezy (2018), representing the first Jurassic occurrence of the genus reported so far.
 Redescription of Palaeopalaemon newberryi and a study on the phylogenetic relationships and life habits of this species is published by Jones et al. (2018).
 Description of the morphology of Tetrachela raiblana and a study on its implication for understanding of the homologies of carapace grooves between polychelidans and other decapods is published by Audo, Hyžný & Charbonnier (2018).
 A large-sized (12.9 mm maximum length) right valve of a marine ostracod is described from the Cretaceous amber from Myanmar by Xing et al. (2018).
 A study evaluating how sexual selection related to species extinction in fossil cytheroid ostracods is published by Fernandes Martins et al. (2018), who report that species with more pronounced sexual dimorphism had higher estimated extinction rates.
 An ostracod fauna including four species belonging to the suborder Darwinulocopina is described from the Lower Jurassic (Hettangian) Whitmore Point Member of the Moenave Formation (Arizona and Utah, United States) by Antonietto et al. (2018), potentially representing the last episode of darwinulocopine dominance in nonmarine environments before the Late Jurassic diversification of the cypridocopine and cytherocopine modern ostracods.
 Oxygen-isotope analysis of a whale barnacle specimen collected from early Pleistocene deposits of Apulia (Italy) is published by Collareta et al. (2018), who interpret their findings as indicating that the barnacle lived on a cetacean that seasonally migrated towards high-latitude areas outside the Mediterranean.

New taxa

Malacostracans

Ostracods

Other crustaceans

Insects

Trilobites

Research
 Frontal auxiliary impressions (muscle scars on the glabella) are described in Mesolenellus hyperboreus from Cambrian Stage 4 strata of North Greenland by Lerosey‐Aubril & Peel (2018), providing new information on the evolution of a pouch‐like digestive organ with powerful extrinsic muscles (i.e. a crop) in trilobites.
 A study on complete moulted exoskeletons of Estaingia bilobata and Redlichia takooensis from the Cambrian Emu Bay Shale (Australia), and their implications for inferring the course of moulting in trilobites, is published by Drage et al. (2018).
 A study assessing the morphological differences within and among three populations of Oryctocephalus indicus from the United States, Siberia and China, using a new method of analysing small morphological features, is published by Esteve et al. (2018).
 A study on early post-embryonic developmental stages of the Cambrian trilobite Ellipsostrenua granulosa is published by Laibl, Cederström & Ahlberg (2018).
 A study on the ontogeny of the co-occurring shumardiid trilobites Akoldinioidia latus and Koldinioidia choii from the middle Furongian Hwajeol Formation (South Korea) is published by Park (2018).
 Remains of the digestive system of a specimen of the bathycheilid species Prionocheilus vokovicensis from the Ordovician Šárka Formation (Czech Republic) are described by Fatka & Budil (2018).
 A study on the postembryonic development of Dalmanitina, based on a large sample of specimens from the Upper Ordovician Prague Basin, is published by Drage, Laibl & Budil (2018).
 A large and almost complete dorsal exoskeleton of a trilobite referred to the species Dipleura dekayi is described from the Devonian Floresta Formation (Colombia) by Carvalho (2018).
 A study on the phylogenetic relationships of species belonging to the genus Metacryphaeus is published by Carbonaro et al. (2018), who also perform a palaeobiogeographic analysis for the distribution of the genus.

New taxa

Other arthropods

Research
 A study on the external and internal anatomy and possible lifestyle of Waptia fieldensis, based on revision of all available specimens available from the repositories in the National Museum of Natural History and the Royal Ontario Museum, is published by Vannier et al. (2018).
 A study on the lateral tail flexibility in the eurypterid Slimonia acuminata published by Persons & Acorn (2017) is criticized by Lamsdell, Marshall & Briggs (2018); Persons (2018) defends his original conclusions on the basis of a study of additional eurypterid specimens.
 A study on the microstructure of gnathobasic spines on the coxa of extant Atlantic horseshoe crab, Silurian eurypterid Eurypterus tetragonophthalmus and Cambrian artiopodan Sidneyia inexpectans is published by Bicknell et al. (2018).
 A study on the mechanical performance of the feeding appendages of Sidneyia inexpectans, based on comparisons with extant Atlantic horseshoe crab, is published by Bicknell et al. (2018).
 Bicknell, Pates & Botton (2018) report abnormalities in specimens of extant (Limulus polyphemus, Tachypleus tridentatus) and fossil (Euproops danae, Mesolimulus walchi) horseshoe crabs, and compare injuries to horseshoe crab cephalothoraces to those affecting Cambrian trilobites to explore the possible timing of the injuries.
 Sánchez-García et al. (2018) report the presence of probable male clasping organs for courtship and securing the female during copulation in the springtail Pseudosminthurides stoechus and an aggregation of up to 45 specimens of the springtail Proisotoma communis from the Cretaceous amber from Spain.
 Closely associated arthropleurid trackways, interpreted as evidence of arthropleurid mating behaviour, are described from the Lower Carboniferous of Fife (Scotland, United Kingdom) by Whyte (2018).
 Two immature specimens of polyxenidan millipedes are described from the Eocene Bitterfeld amber (Germany) by Haug et al. (2018).
 First known millipede fossil material from Central America (disarticulated trunk segments of members of the genus Nyssodesmus from the late Pleistocene of Costa Rica) is described by Laurito & Valerio (2018).
 Insect resting traces and arthropod trackways are described from the Eocene Mount Wawel Formation (King George Island, Antarctica) by Uchman, Gaździcki & Błażejowski (2018), who name a new ichnofamily Protichnidae and a new ichnospecies Glaciichnium australis.
 Revision of blood-feeding arthropods from the Paleogene Baltic amber is published by Pielowska, Sontag & Szadziewski (2018).

New taxa

References

2018 in paleontology
2010s in paleontology
2018 in science